Leda was launched in 1807 at Whitby. She spent most of her career as a London transport, and then a West Indiaman. She was wrecked in May 1819 on a voyage to Bombay while sailing under a license from the British East India Company (EIC).

Career
Leda first appeared in Lloyd's Register (LR) in 1808 with Wilmot, master, Richardson, owner, and trade London transport.

In 1813 the EIC lost its monopoly on the trade between India and Britain. British ships were then free to sail to India or the Indian Ocean under a license from the EIC. In January 1819 Leda, G.Lamb, master, sailed for Bombay.

Fate
Leda, Lamb, master, arrived at Madeira on 17 February 1819 and sailed for Bombay. She was wrecked but her crew were rescued. They arrived at Bombay on 24 June.

Citations and references
Citations

References
 
 

1807 ships
Ships built in Whitby
Age of Sail merchant ships of England
Maritime incidents in 1819